Koilighugar Waterfall is in Jharsuguda district, Odisha, India.

Location
From Gobindpur Chowk in National Highway 49, which is between Jharsuguda and Raigarh, take a right turn. A  drive from there through thick śāl and mahua forests will take one to Koilighugar Waterfall.

Places of interest
The waterfall is in a rivulet named Ahiraj which originates from the 'Chhuikhanch' forest. After the waterfall, the rivulet flows westwards to merge into the  Mahanadi river. It is a picturesque beauty spot with its sylvan backdrop.

Inside the fall there is a Shivalingam known as Maheswarnath. The lingam is submerged in water and is not ordinarily visible. For the benefit of the pilgrims, another Shivalingam has been created outside the waterfall.

Koilighugar has an annual fair on the occasion of Sivaratri.

place to visit

References

External links
 https://sites.google.com/view/koilighugarwaterfall/
 Tourism in Jharsuguda
 Waterfalls in Orissa 

Waterfalls of Odisha